The 2017 Internationaux de France was the 5th event of six in the 2017–18 ISU Grand Prix of Figure Skating, a senior-level international invitational competition series. It was held at Patinoire Polesud in Grenoble on November 17–19. Medals were awarded in the disciplines of men's singles, ladies' singles, pair skating, and ice dance. Skaters earned points toward qualifying for the 2017–18 Grand Prix Final.

Records 

The following new ISU best scores were set during this competition:

Entries 
The ISU published the preliminary assignments on May 26, 2017.

Changes to preliminary assignments

Results

Men

Ladies

Pairs

Ice dance

References

Citations

External links 
 2017 Internationaux de France at the International Skating Union

Internationaux de France
Internationaux de France
Internationaux de France
Internationaux de France
Sports competitions in Grenoble